National Route 4 is a national highway in South Korea connects Gunsan to Gyeongju. It established on 31 August 1971.

Main stopovers

North Jeolla Province
 Gunsan
South Chungcheong Province
 Seocheon County - Buyeo County - Nonsan - Gyeryong
Daejeon
 Yuseong District - Seo District - Jung District - Dong District
North Chungcheong Province
 Okcheon County - Yeongdong County
North Gyeongsang Province
 Gimcheon - Chilgok County
Daegu
 Buk District - Seo District - Buk District - Dong District - Suseong District - Dong District
North Gyeongsang Province
 Gyeongsan - Yeongcheon - Gyeongju

Major intersections

 (■): Motorway
IS: Intersection, IC: Interchange

North Jeolla Province

South Chungcheong Province

Daejeon

North Chungcheong Province

North Gyeongsang Province (West Daegu)

Daegu

North Gyeongsang Province (East Daegu)

References

4
Roads in North Jeolla
Roads in South Chungcheong
Roads in North Chungcheong
Roads in Daejeon
Roads in North Gyeongsang
Roads in Daegu